Andrzej Piotr Ruszczyński (born July 29, 1951) is a Polish-American applied mathematician, noted for his 
contributions to mathematical optimization, in particular, stochastic programming and risk-averse optimization.

Schooling and positions
Ruszczyński was born and educated in Poland. In 1969 he won the XX Polish Mathematical Olympiad. After graduating in 1974 with a master's degree from the Department of Electronics,
Warsaw University of Technology, he joined the Institute of Automatic Control at this school. 
In 1977 he received his PhD degree for a dissertation on control of large-scale systems, and in 1983  Habilitation, for a dissertation on nonlinear stochastic programming. In 1992 the President of Poland, Lech Wałęsa, awarded Ruszczyński the state title of Professor. 
In 1984-86 Ruszczyński was a visiting scholar at the Institute for Operations Research, University of Zurich. In 1986-87 he was the vice-director of the Institute of Automatic Control, 
and in 1987-1990 he was the Vice-Dean of the Department of Electronics, Warsaw University of Technology. In 1992 Ruszczyński was a visiting professor 
at the Department of Operations Research, Princeton University, in 1992-96 he led the project Optimization under Uncertainty at the International Institute for Applied Systems Analysis, in 1996-97 he was a visiting professor at the Department of Industrial Engineering, University of Wisconsin-Madison, 
and since 1997 he has been with Rutgers University, where he holds a position of the Board of Governors Professor at the Rutgers Business School.

Main achievements 
Ruszczyński developed decomposition methods for stochastic programming problems, the theory of stochastic dominance constraints (jointly with Darinka Dentcheva), contributed to the theory of coherent, conditional, and dynamic risk measures (jointly with Alexander Shapiro), and created the theory of Markov risk measures.
He authored five books and more than 100 research papers.

He was elected to the 2017 class of Fellows of the Institute for Operations Research and the Management Sciences. In 2018 Ruszczyński (jointly with A. Shapiro) received the Dantzig Prize of the Society for Industrial and Applied Mathematics and the 
Mathematical Optimization Society.

Selected books

Most influential papers 
 Ruszczyński, A., A regularized decomposition method for minimizing a sum of polyhedral functions, Mathematical Programming 35 (1986) 309–333.

 Mulvey, J. M.; and Ruszczyński, A., A new scenario decomposition method for large-scale stochastic optimization, Operations Research 43(1995) 477–490.
 Ogryczak, W.; and Ruszczyński, A., Dual stochastic dominance and related mean—risk models, SIAM Journal on Optimization 13 (2002) 60–78.
 Dentcheva, D.; and Ruszczyński, A., Optimization with stochastic dominance constraints, SIAM Journal on Optimization 14 (2003) 548–566.
Ruszczyński, A.; and Shapiro, A., Optimization of convex risk functions, Mathematics of Operations Research 31 (2006) 433–452.

Chess composition

Under the name Piotr, Ruszczyński is known as an author of  chess problems holding the title of International Master of Chess Composition of FIDE (since 1988). 29 his problems of all genres were selected to FIDE Albums  by the  Permanent Commission of the FIDE for Chess Compositions. 

To the left is one of early Ruszczyński's problems. The key 1. Qh6! threatens 2. Qf8 and 3. Qd6#. After
1 ... Ke6 white still plays 2. Qf8 Kxd7 3. Qe7#. The two main variations present the idea of half-pin:
1 ... f5 2. Rd5+ Ke6 3. exf5# (using the pinning of Pg6), and 
1 ... g5 2. Re7+ Kd6 3. e5# (using the pinning of Pf6). All variations end with model mates; the main two variations have identical
mate pictures on different squares.

To the right is one of Ruszczyński's best known strategic threemovers. The key is 1.Qf6! 
with the threat 2. fxg3+ Kxe1 3. Bd2#. In the two main variations, black Grimshaw 
intersection on the square c3 is exploited with anticipatory shut-offs
from a white half battery. After 1. ... Bc3  white plays 2. Nc2!  (threatening 3. Bd2#), and then
2.   ...  Bxf6  3. Be3# (using the anticipatory shutoff on c2),
2.   ...  Bxb2 3. Bxb2#, and
2.   ...  Be1  3. Ne3#.
After 1. ... Rc3 white plays 2. Bd2!  (threatening  3. Nc2#), and then
2.  ...   Rf3   3. Nd3# (using the anticipatory shutoff on d2),
2.  ...   Re3  3. fxe3#, and
2.  ...   Rc1  3. fxg3#.

With Jan Rusinek,  Ruszczyński co-authored the book:

References

External links
 Homepage of Andrzej Ruszczyński at Rutgers University. Contains biography, research overviews, lectures and presentations.
  Rutgers Business School article on Ruszczyński.
 

1951 births
20th-century American mathematicians
21st-century American mathematicians
20th-century Polish mathematicians
21st-century Polish mathematicians
American operations researchers
Living people
Rutgers University faculty
Chess composers
American people of Polish descent
Fellows of the Institute for Operations Research and the Management Sciences